Following is a list of senators of Vienne, people who have represented the department of Vienne in the Senate of France.

Third Republic

Senators for Vienne under the French Third Republic were:

 Louis Olivier Bourbeau (1876–1877)
 Paul de Ladmirault (1876–1891)
 Eugène Arnaudeau (1877–1891)
 Louis de Beauchamp (1885–1891)
 Henri Salomon (1891–1900)
 Aristide Couteaux (1891–1906)
 Léopold Thézard (1891–1907)
 Célestin Contancin en 1900)
 Maurice Demarçay (1900–1907)
 Guillaume Poulle (1906–1927)
 Jacques Servant (1907–1920)
 Victor Surreaux (1907–1920)
 François Albert (1920–1927)
 Raymond Duplantier (1920–1936)
 Raoul Péret (1927–1936)
 Victor Boret (1927–1940)
 Adrien André (1936–1940)
 Georges Maurice (1936–1940)

Fourth Republic

Senators for Vienne under the French Fourth Republic were:

 Alphonse Bouloux (1946–1948)
 René Tognard (1946–1948)
 Georges Maurice (1948–1958)
 Jacques Masteau (1948–1959)
 Jean-Marie Bouloux (1958–1959)

Fifth Republic 
Senators for Vienne under the French Fifth Republic:

References

Sources

 
Lists of members of the Senate (France) by department